Chip Duncan (born January 3, 1955) is an American filmmaker, author and photographer, known principally for documentaries on history, current affairs, travel, and natural history. He is also president of Duncan Group, Inc., a production company and has produced feature films including Eden, nominated for the 1996 Grand Jury Prize at Sundance Film Festival and Row Your Boat starring Jon Bon Jovi.

Early life and education
Chip Duncan was born in Shenandoah, Iowa and later resided in Michigan and Wisconsin. Duncan graduated from the University of Wisconsin, Madison with a degree in English and Communication Arts. At that time, he was member of the campus band Broken Bow. The band released one album, Arrival, in 1981.

Film and television career
Duncan began his career in media at an NBC affiliate as a news producer and photographer. He co-wrote for the 1985 remake of The Twilight Zone and founded his own production company the same year. His early career saw him produce Is Anyone Listening? (1986-87), an educational series for teenagers.

In 1992, Duncan made Tatshenshini: A Journey to the Ice Age, a documentary for public television. He won the Best New Wildlife Filmmaker award at the 1993 Jackson Hole Wildlife Festival for his 1993 production Alaska's Bald Eagle: New Threats to Survival. During his production of the 1994 public television special Positive Thinking: The Norman Vincent Peale Story, Duncan and co-producer David Crouse interviewed five American presidents: Richard Nixon, Jimmy Carter, Gerald Ford, George H. W. Bush and Ronald Reagan.

Duncan's production of the 1996 13-part television series Mystic Lands, about spiritual places of the world, debuted on Discovery Networks. Duncan was the series creator, executive producer, and director.

Duncan's feature film credits include producing Eden, a 1996 Sundance Film Festival Finalist, nominated for the Grand Jury Prize. That same year, Duncan was executive producer of the movie Cadillac Ranch. He was also producer of the movie Row Your Boat featuring Jon Bon Jovi and co-executive producer of The Break Up featuring Kiefer Sutherland and Bridget Fonda.

In 1999, Duncan produced and directed Through One City's Eyes, an in-depth campaign on race relations that included a nationwide public television broadcast, a seven-part public radio series, a two-part classroom series for middle school students, and a traveling photo museum.

In 2015, Duncan released The Sound Man, a documentary about 62-year old Kenyan sound engineer Abdul Rahman Ramadhan's career covering crisis zones in East Africa. Working with photojournalist Mohamed Amin, Abdul recorded the sounds of genocide, war, revolution, anarchy and famine in Ethiopia, Eritrea, Kenya, Sudan, Somalia and Rwanda. The film won awards at: the 2015 Edmonton Film Festival (Documentary Short Film Award); the 2015 Newport Beach Film Festival (Outstanding Achievement in Film-making Documentary Impact Award for a Short Film); 2015 CINE Golden Eagle (Award of Excellence in Best Shorts Competition); the 2015 Athens International Film & Video Festival (Black Bear Award); and the 2015 Milwaukee Film Festival (Winner, Official Selection). It was also entered into the Official Selection at numerous other festivals in 2015, including the Nashville Film Festival, Beverly Hills Film Festival, Montreal World Film Festival, New Orleans Film Festival, St. Louis International Film Festival, and UNAFF International Film Festival.

Books
Duncan's first non-fiction book, released under the name John Ryan Duncan, was The Magic Never Ends –- The Life and Work of C.S. Lewis, published in 2001 by Thomas Nelson Publishing. It was released in paperback by Augsburg Press in 2004. He also wrote Enough To Go Around: Searching for Hope in Afghanistan, Pakistan & Darfur, released in 2009 by Select Books. 

His first fiction book, Half A Reason to Die: Eight Short Stories, was published in spring of 2017 by Select Books. Duncan's fourth book, a return to non-fiction, was Inspiring Change: The Photographic Journey of Chip Duncan, released in 2018 by Thunder House Press.

Photography
Duncan's work as a still photographer has been exhibited in numerous locations since 2009, including the Charles Allis Art Museum (2018), the Kenosha Public Museum (2016), Council on Foreign Relations (2013), the World Peace Festival in Berlin (2011), the O Street Museum in Washington, DC (2011) and the Crooked Tree Arts Center in Michigan (2009). His photographic work heavily features people from Afghanistan, Ethiopia, Peru, Sudan, Ghana, Colombia, Pakistan and Kenya.

Other work
Duncan is president of the Duncan Group Inc., a documentary and feature film production company established in 1984. He is a board member for the Juneau Icefield Research Program, a trustee for the Loisaba Community Conservation Foundation, and an advisor to the World Peace Festival in Berlin and the America's Black Holocaust Museum in Milwaukee, Wisconsin.

Filmography

Feature films
 Eden (1996) - Producer
 Cadillac Ranch (1997) – Executive Producer
 The Break Up (1999) - Co-executive producer
 Row Your Boat (1998) - Producer
 Coyotes (1999) - Co-executive producer

Documentaries 

 The Nuclear Nightmare (1986)
 To Whom It May Concern (1986)
 Urban Turf (1986)
 Decisions: Teens, Sex & Pregnancy (1986)
 Back On The Street (1986)
 No Fault Kids (1987)
 Fitting In: A New Look At Peer Pressure (1987)
 Emphasis Wisconsin: Water (1989)
 Washington D.C.: A Capital Adventure (1989)
 Emphasis Wisconsin: Maximum Security & Prison Boot Camp (1990)
 New York: City of Cities (1990)
 Australia: Secrets Of The Land Down Under (1990)
 India: Land Of Spirit & Mystique (1991)
 Greece: Playground of the Gods (1991)
 Norway: Nature's Triumph (1992)
 Denmark: The Jewel Of Europe (1992)
 Sweden: Nordic Treasure (1992)
 Astrodudes (1993)
 Scotland: Land of Legends (1994)
 Scandinavia: Land of the Midnight Sun (1994)
 Alaska's Bald Eagle: New Threats To Survival (1994)
 Tatshenshini: A Journey To The Ice Age (1994)
 Positive Thinking (1994)
 Iowa: An American Portrait (1996; as Photographer)
 Mystic Lands (1996; 13-part series)
 The World Sacred Music Festival (1999)
 Worth Fighting For (1999)
 Through One City's Eyes (1999)
 Wisconsin: An American Portrait (2000)
 Rafting Alaska's Wildest Rivers (2001)
 The Magic Never Ends: The Life and Work of CS Lewis (2002)
 In A Just World: Contraception, Abortion & World Religion (2003)
 Henry A. Wallace (2004; as Photographer/Consulting Producer)
 Beyond The Gridiron: The Life & Times of Woody Hayes (2004)
 The Cost of Freedom: Civil Liberties, Security and the USA PATRIOT Act (2004)
 The Rivalry (2007; as Consulting Producer)
 Prayer In America (2007)
 Landslide: A Portrait of President Herbert Hoover (2009)
 The Reagan Presidency (2013)
 The Sound Man (2015)
 Tolkien & Lewis - Myth, Imagination and the Quest for Meaning (2017; released nationwide in the United States on public television in September 2017 by American Public Television)

References

External links
 Biography at the Duncan Group website 
 Duncan Abroad blogspot
 Chip Duncan at the Internet Movie Database
 Interview with Becky Roozen, On Milwaukee website 
 Interview with Jane Hampden about Prayer in America, WUWM's Lake Effect
 Crooked Tree Arts Center, Petoskey, MI - "Images of Humanity and Hope", Photographic exhibition of work from Duncan's book Enough To Go Around
 "Images of Humanity and Hope" Photographic Exhibition, The Graphic Weekly
 Radio interview with Stephanie Lecci about Enough To Go Around, WUWM's Lake Effect – February 22, 2010
 Radio interview on The Exchange, Iowa Public Radio, about Enough To Go Around, February 16, 2010
 Radio interview with Ben Kieffer of Iowa Public Radio about The Reagan Presidency
 Interview with Patrick Gavin of Politico about The Reagan Presidency, February 26, 2013
 Interview with Phil Ponce of Chicago Tonight about The Reagan Presidency, WTTW, June 13, 2013

American filmmakers
1955 births
Living people
People from Shenandoah, Iowa